Maha Bo Vannama is a song composed by Chandraratne Manawasinghe and W.D. Amaradeva to the Daha Ata Vannama. It was written as a dedication to the Jaya Sri Maha Bodhi, the sacred fig tree in the Mahamevnāwa Gardens, Anuradhapura. A dance recital was created and performed for the Vannama by the duo of Niththawela Gunaya and Heen Baba Dharmasiri.

See also
W.D. Amaradeva
Chandraratne Manawasinghe

References

Sri Lankan music